Steve Dusseau (born March 30, 1983) was an All-American lacrosse player for Georgetown University, where he was a two-time All-American and won the 2002 USILA National Player of the Year award. He led the Hoyas to NCAA Men's Lacrosse Championship appearances in 2001 and 2002. He played his high school lacrosse for Upper Arlington High School in Columbus, Ohio, where he was also an All-American.

In 2002, Dusseau was drafted by the Major League Lacrosse's Boston Cannons with the second pick in the 1st round of the 2002 MLL Collegiate Draft. Steve was selected to the 2003 MLL All Stars team

Statistics

Major League Lacrosse

Georgetown University

References

Awards

1983 births
Living people
American lacrosse players
Georgetown Hoyas men's lacrosse players
Major League Lacrosse players
Boston Cannons players
Lacrosse midfielders
Sportspeople from Columbus, Ohio
People from Upper Arlington, Ohio